Thomas Unniyadan is a politician, former MLA and former Government Chief Whip of the Govt. of Kerala. He is at present the Deputy Chairman of Kerala Congress. He was a member of Kerala legislative assembly from Irinjalakuda from 2001 to 2016. He was born in Vaikom, the famous temple town in Kottayam district, as the son of Sri. Mathew Joseph and Smt. Mary Joseph. He is an advocate by profession. He was awarded the best MLA multiple times and has achieved several recognitions and awards in the national and international level. He was credited with achieving complete electrification of his constituency and was the first constituency in India to achieve this feat. He was also instrumental in familiarizing computers among school children. He is married to Smt. Sherly, and has two daughters. He is settled in Irinjalakuda.

Performance in assembly elections

Political Career
Adv.Thomas Unniyadan started his political career as college student union chairman. He joined Kerala Congress and was the MLA (Member of Legislative Assembly) of Irinjalakuda Constituency in Thrissur District of Kerala from 2001 to 2016. He  was the former  Legislative petitions committee chairman and also held the positions in various committees as Committee member in State Legislative Subject committee and as a committee member of the Legislative Subordinate Registration Committee. Presently he is the Deputy Chairman of Kerala Congress Party.

References

Living people
People from Vaikom
1958 births
Kerala Congress (M) politicians
Kerala MLAs 2001–2006
Kerala MLAs 2006–2011
Kerala MLAs 2011–2016